Amorgos is the easternmost island of the Cyclades island group and the nearest island to the neighboring Dodecanese island group in Greece.

Geography

Due to its position near the ancient Ionian towns, such as Miletus, Halicarnassus and Ephesus, Amorgos became one of the first places from which the Ionians passed through to the Cycladic Islands and onto the Greek mainland.

History

Throughout history, Amorgos was also known as Yperia, or Platagy, Pagali, Psichia, and Karkisia. Amorgos features many remnants of ancient civilizations. At the time of Archaic Greece, there were three independent city-states there. They are believed to have featured autonomous constitutions but the same currency. Amorgos is distinguished by the size and quality of the walls surrounding the city of Arkesini, the ancient towers whose remains are scattered around the island, ancient tombs, stone tools, inscriptions, vases and by other antiquities.

Due to the name Minoa, it is suspected that Amorgos had been colonized by the Cretans from ancient times, but there is no archeological evidence supporting this view.

Early Cycladic period

Almost a dozen separate inhabited centres are known in this period. Amorgos is the origin of many famous Cycladic figurines. ‘Dokathismata style’ figurines were originally found here. Cycladic sculptures had been discovered from the cemeteries at Aghia Paraskevi, Aghios Pavlos, Dokathismata, Kapros, Kapsala, Nikouria and Stavros.

'Kapsala Cycladic figurines', dating around 2700 B.C., are named after a find place in Amorgos. This is the earliest of the 'canonical types' – a reclining female with folded arms. They tend to have slender and elongated proportions. At this time, anatomical features such as arms are modeled three-dimensionally. With the later types, sculptors tended to render this feature with incised lines.

'Dokathismata Cycladic figurines' date from a somewhat later period of 2400–2100 BC. Compared to the statuettes of the Spedos type—the most common and renowned type of figurines featuring finely modeled and somewhat rounded shapes—the statuettes of the Dokathismata type tend to have a more slender and sometimes angular silhouette.

Classical period
Part of the island is named Aspis, where the ancient temple of the goddess Aphrodite stood.

In approximately 630 BC, the poet Semonides led the foundation of a Samian colony on Amorgos.  The Periplus of Pseudo-Scylax mentions it as Tripolis. It was a member of the Delian League.  It participated in the Second Athenian League.
In 322 BC, Athens and Macedonia fought the naval Battle of Amorgos.

Heraclides Lembus wrote that the island produced much wine, as well as olive oil and fruits.

With the passing of time, the island's name changed to Amolgon and Amourgon.

Byzantine, Ottoman and Modern
In the 5th century, Bishop Theodore, who attended a synod in Constantinople, signed as Bishop of the Parians, Sifnians, and Amoulgians. It was known as Yamurgi during Ottoman rule between 1566 and 1829.

The shock had a moment magnitude of 7.7 and had a maximum Mercalli intensity of IX (Violent). Fifty-three people were killed and 100 were injured.

Government

The names of the three cities given by Stephanus Byzantinus are Arkesini, Minoa, Aigiali or Melania which, according to inscriptions, are the most correct. The three towns are on the island's west coast because that is where bays and natural ports that could provide the proper positioning for seaside towns and forts exist.

Aigiali was on the north East Side of the island close to the present day locations of Tholaria and Stroumvos and to this day can still be found there. Minoa is situated at the center of the northern side near the present day village of Katapola and Arkesini close to the present-day lowland location Kastri.

Excavations and findings, especially burial tombs, prove the intense presence of Amorgos during the prehistoric years, particularly during the first period of Cycladic civilization (3200 to 2000 BC).

Cinema and popular culture 
The island was featured in Luc Besson's film The Big Blue (1988), in which Agia Anna and the monastery of Panagia Hozoviotissa can be seen. The island was also featured in Giorgos Kordelas' film Ariadni (2002). Amorgos has been referenced online due to the similarity of its name to the video game Among Us.

Municipal districts 
The municipality of Amorgos is subdivided into the following communities (population at 2011 census and constituent villages within brackets):
Aigiali (514, Aigiali, Agios Pavlos, Ormos Egialis, Potamos)
Amorgos (409, Chora, Kastelopetra)
Arkesini (179, Arkesini, Kalotaritissa, Kalofana, Mavri Myti, Rachoula)
Katapola (595, Katapola, Lefkes, Nera, Xylokeratidi, Pera Rachidi, Rachidi, Christoulaki)
Tholaria (189, Tholaria, Paralia Tholarion)
Vroutsis (87, Vroutsis, Kamari)

Historical population

Climate
Amorgos has a warm-summer Mediterranean climate with mild temperatures all year.

Landmarks

The monastery of Panagia Hozoviotissa is situated on the cliffside, northeast of Chora. It was built early in the second millennium in order to protect a religious icon, dating from the year 812, from intruders. The icon is on public display inside the monastery. Opening time for visitors every day from 8:00 a.m. to 1:00 p.m and 5:00 p.m. to 7:00 p.m. Visitors have to be dressed in a specific way in order to enter. Men have to wear long trousers and women a skirt or a wrap around shift down to the knee, not trousers. The shift may, however, be worn over trousers. As of July 2012, the monastery is active and houses three practicing monks.

Tourism is increasing slowly, although the island's geographical features prevent mass tourism. It is accessible only by boat. The three main tourist accommodations are located in Katapola, Aegiali and Chora. Hiking paths are relatively well maintained. Other activities include scuba diving, free-diving, and visiting the island's beaches (although this isn't its main attraction, like other Greek islands).

Another landmark in the area is a group of windmills that can be seen on a hill above Chora. A couple of them can be visited, while others are either locked or in ruins. It's easy to reach the location either by car or on foot, going through Chora. There is no admission to enter the area.

See also
List of settlements in the Cyclades
List of islands of Greece
Markiani

References

Sources

External links

The official Amorgos web site at Amorgos.gov.gr: Amorgos Portal by the Municipality of Amorgos 
 
 

 
Populated places in Naxos (regional unit)
Mediterranean port cities and towns in Greece
Cyclades
Municipalities of the South Aegean
Islands of Greece
Landforms of Naxos (regional unit)
Islands of the South Aegean
Members of the Delian League